A Modern Jazz Symposium of Music and Poetry is an album by the jazz bassist, composer, and band leader Charles Mingus, released by Bethlehem Records in mid-1959. In spite of the title, the album does not contain any poetry.  "Scenes in the City", however, includes narration performed by Mel Stewart and written by actor Lonne Elder with assistance from Langston Hughes. The composition "Duke's Choice" re-appears, in updated form, as "I X Love" on the 1963 album Mingus Mingus Mingus Mingus Mingus.  "Nouroog", "Duke's Choice" and "Slippers" form the basis of the suite "Open Letter to Duke" on Mingus Ah Um.

The CD issues of the album include three bonus tracks: the Dizzy Gillespie standard "Woody 'n' You", Charlie Parker's "Billie's Bounce", which is listed as "Bounce" and miscredited to Mingus, and an alternate take of "Slippers".

Reception
The AllMusic review by Scott Yanow called the album "an excellent set of challenging yet often accessible music".  The Penguin Guide to Jazz deemed it "an opportunity for Mingus to experiment with texts and with pure sound". The Penguin editors furthermore cite Clarence Shaw's performance on "New York Sketchbook" as "the best trumpet heard on a Mingus album for some time before or since".

Track listing 
All titles by Charles Mingus, except where noted.
 "Scenes in the City" (Music: Mingus; Narrative: Elder, Hughes) – 11:55
 "Nouroog" – 4:52
 "New York Sketchbook" – 8:55
 "Duke's Choice" – 6:27
 "Slippers" – 3:29
Bonus tracks
 "Woody 'n' You" (Gillespie) – 8:44
 Mistitled "Wouldn't You" on earlier releases
 "Bounce" (Parker) – 9:22
 "Slippers (Alternate Take)" – 3:50

Personnel 
 Charles Mingus – bass
 Jimmy Knepper – trombone
 Shafi Hadi – tenor and alto saxophone
 Bill Hardman – trumpet (on "Nouroog")
 Clarence Shaw – trumpet (except on "Nouroog")
 Dannie Richmond – drums
 Horace Parlan – piano (on "Nouroog", "Duke's Choice", "Slippers"; left hand during final solo on "New York Sketchbook")
 Bob Hammer – piano (on remaining tracks)
 Mel Stewart – voice (narration on "Scenes in the City")

References 

Charles Mingus albums
1959 albums
Bethlehem Records albums